Czerlejewo  is a village in the administrative district of Gmina Wschowa, within Wschowa County, Lubusz Voivodeship, in western Poland. It has a population of approximately 30.

References

Czerlejewo